The women's ne-waza 55 kg competition in ju-jitsu at the 2017 World Games took place on 28 July 2017 at the GEM Sports Complex in Wrocław, Poland.

Results

Elimination round

Group A

Group B

Finals
{{#invoke:RoundN|N4
|widescore=yes|bold_winner=high|team-width=260
|RD1=Semifinals
|3rdplace=yes

||{{flagIOC2athlete|Amal Amjahid|BEL|2017 World Games}}|100||0
|||0|{{flagIOC2athlete|Bayarmaa Munkhgerel|MGL|2017 World Games}}|100

||

References

Ju-jitsu at the 2017 World Games